Mayoko District is a district in the Niari Department of  Republic of the Congo. The capital lies at Mayoko. It has a northern border with Gabon.  As of 2007, the population is 5,147.

Transport 

Mayoko is served by a branch railway of the Congo–Ocean Railway that terminates in Mbinda.  It lies near the border with Gabon.

Mining 

Mayoko is near deposits of iron ore, which are very close to an existing railway line leading to a port.

See also 

 Railway stations in the Republic of the Congo
 Iron ore in Africa

References 

Niari Department
Districts of the Republic of the Congo